Badalovo is a village in Zakarpattia Oblast (province) of western Ukraine. It is located on the river bank of Tisza, not far from the Ukrainian-Hungarian border. Administratively, the village belongs to the Berehove Raion, Zakarpattia Oblast. The village was first mentioned as  Bodolou in  1226.

Population
In 2002, the population included 1714 inhabitants, of whom 1682 are Hungarians.

See also
List of villages in Zakarpattia Oblast

References 

Villages in Berehove Raion